Raimundo Fagner Cândido Lopes (born in Orós, Ceará, October 13, 1949) is a Brazilian singer, composer, musician, actor and music producer. He is commonly known by the stage name of Fagner.

Biography
The youngest of the five children of José Fares, a Lebanese immigrant from Ain Ebel and Dona Francisca, Fagner was born in Fortaleza, the capital of the state of Ceará, although his birth was recorded in Orós.

At the age of five, he won a youth competition at a local radio station. As a teen, he formed vocal and instrumental groups and began to compose his own music. In 1968, he won the Festival de Música Popular do Ceará (Popular Music Festival of Ceará) with his song "Nada Sou".

Career

In 1971 he recorded his first single compact in partnership with another musician from Ceará, Wilson Cirino. It was released by the label RGE, but was not a huge success. The goal was to beat the record success of singers like Antonio Carlos and Jocafi. In the same year, he went to Rio de Janeiro, where Elis Regina recorded "Mucuripe" which became Fagner's first success as a songwriter and singer. At the same time, he also recorded the same song on a 7", with Caetano Veloso singing "A volta da Asa Branca."

Caetano, being an intellectual type, always distanced himself from what is considered pop music (although Tropicália has launched the rock 'intellectual' in Brazil and South America) and Fagner already represented a Brazilian music rooted much more in the pop music.

Other works, like their fourth album, Orós, 1977, an album that had arrangements and musical direction by Hermeto Pascoal, show a more unconventional approach, one less concerned with commercial success. In the end the 1970s, he released two more albums: Eu Canto (1978) with another poem by Cecília Meireles - "Motivo", with melody by Fagner and even though he credited the late poet, Fagner still faced legal trouble with her heirs, and the album had to be reissued with "Quem me levará sou eu" instead of Motivo, and Beleza (1979). Fagner was considered by the readers of Playboy magazine to be the best singer in the year of 1979, while Roberto Carlos (considered to be the King of Latin music) was in second place.

In the 1980s, Fagner kept to his northeastern roots, and was divided at the same time with romanticism. His first LP of the 1980s was Eternas Ondas. In this same disc, Fagner made a version with the help of Frederick Mendes, of the classic John Lennon and Yoko Ono "Oh My Love" from the album Imagine 1971. Taking advantage of his popularity, Continental released the album Juntos - Fagner and Belchior, a compilation containing tracks from the album Ave Noturna, the only released by Continental. Polydor, in turn, reissued Manera Fru Fru Manera. In 1981, he recorded the album Traduz-se which is a major milestone in his career, The disc was released throughout Europe and Latin America, sold over 250,000 copies in a short time, and was certified platinum.

In 1971 he moved to Brasília, taking first place in the Festival de Música Popular do Centro de Estudos Universitários de Brasília (Popular Music Festival of the University Studies Center of Brasília) with his song "Mucuripe" (with collaborator Belchior), which was later recorded by artist Elis Regina, and became Fagner's first notable success as a composer. He won prizes in other categories with additional songs, as well.

He has had a distinguished career as a performer, singer, songwriter and composer for over three decades, and is also known for his collaborations with other MPB artists such as Caetano Veloso, Roberta Miranda, Chico Buarque, and others.

In 2003 Fagner was sued for alleged plagiarism: his song As Penas do Tiê appeared to have the same melody and lyrics as a song of one of earlier Brazilian composer Hekel Tavares. In recent times, he has been considered one of the greatest composers of the Spanish language (accomplishment achieved by several Brazilian singers), through his affiliations with non-Latin musicians such as Argentina's Mercedes Sosa.

In November 2014, Fagner released a collaborative live album with singer and acoustic guitarist Zé Ramalho, entitled Fagner & Zé Ramalho ao Vivo.

Discography

Albums
1973 - Manera Fru Fru, Manera
1975 - Ave Noturna
1976 - Raimundo Fagner
1977 - Orós (featuring Hermeto Pascoal)
1978 - Eu Canto - Quem Viver Chorará
1979 - Beleza
1980 - Eternas Ondas
1981 - Traduzir-se
1982 - Sorriso Novo - Qualquer Música
1983 - Palavra de Amor
1984 - A Mesma Pessoa - Cartaz
1985 - Fagner - Semente
1986 - Fagner - Lua do Leblon
1987 - Romance no Deserto
1989 - O Quinze
1991 - Pedras que Cantam
1993 - Demais
1994 - Caboclo Sonhador
1995 - Retrato
1996 - Raimundo Fagner - Pecado Verde
1997 - Terral
2001 - Fagner
2004 - Donos do Brasil
2007 - Fortaleza
2009 - Uma Canção no Rádio

Others
1981 - Raimundo Fagner Canta en Español
1984 - Fagner - Dez Anos
1986 - Poets in New York (Poetas en Nueva York) (contributor, Federico García Lorca tribute album)
1991 - Fagner en Español
1993 - Uma Noite Demais - Ao Vivo no Japão
1998 - Amigos e Canções
2000 - Ao Vivo
2002 - Me Leve (ao vivo)
2003 - Fagner & Zeca Baleiro
2014 - Fagner & Zé Ramalho ao Vivo

References

External links
Raimundo Fagner official website

1949 births
Living people
Brazilian songwriters
20th-century Brazilian male singers
20th-century Brazilian singers
Brazilian people of Lebanese descent
People from Ceará
Brazilian rock singers
Música Popular Brasileira singers
21st-century Brazilian male singers
21st-century Brazilian singers